The following lists events that happened during 1969 in New Zealand.

Population
 Estimated population as of 31 December: 2,804,000
 Increase since 31 December 1968: 31,000 (1.12%)
 Males per 100 females: 99.7.

Incumbents

Regal and viceregal
Head of State – Elizabeth II
Governor-General – Sir Arthur Porritt Bt GCMG GCVO CBE.

Government
The 35th parliament concluded and a general election was held on 26 November. It saw the Second National Government of New Zealand returned for a fourth term, with 45 of the 84 seats. The Social Credit Party lost its only seat. The overall vote was very close, with National only 1% ahead of Labour in total votes cast.

Speaker of the House – Roy Jack .
Prime Minister – Keith Holyoake
Deputy Prime Minister – Jack Marshall.
Minister of Finance – Robert Muldoon.
Minister of Foreign Affairs – Keith Holyoake.
Attorney-General – Ralph Hanan until 24 July, then vacant until Jack Marshall appointed on 22 December.
Chief Justice — Sir Richard Wild

Parliamentary opposition
 Leader of the Opposition –   Norman Kirk (Labour).
 Leader of the Social Credit Party – Vernon Cracknell until 26 November

Main centre leaders
Mayor of Auckland – Dove-Myer Robinson
Mayor of Hamilton – Mike Minogue
Mayor of Wellington – Frank Kitts
Mayor of Christchurch – Ron Guthrey
Mayor of Dunedin – Jim Barnes

Events
 The voting age is lowered from 21 to 20.
 A law change allows the number of seats in Parliament to increase in order to preserve the number of South Island seats. This increases the number of MPs from 80 to 84.
 The trading banks computerise cheque handling and money transfer between banks with overnight processing, between February and November, see Databank Systems Limited.
 The Maui gas field was discovered, 35 km off the coast of Taranaki.
 The Save Manapouri campaign was launched at a public meeting in Invercargill in October.
 The Auckland Harbour Bridge was widened from 4 to 8 lanes.
 Blood and breath alcohol limits introduced for drivers.

Arts and literature
Warren Dibble wins the Robert Burns Fellowship.

See 1969 in art, 1969 in literature

Music

New Zealand Music Awards
Loxene Golden Disc  Shane – Saint Paul

See: 1969 in music

Radio and television
 Coverage of the Apollo 11 moon landing on videotape was flown from Sydney to Wellington by the RNZAF, and a microwave link was put together to allow its simultaneous broadcast throughout the country.
 5 November: the first Network News bulletin was read at 7.35 pm by Dougal Stevenson and received simultaneously around the country

See: 1969 in New Zealand television, 1969 in television, List of TVNZ television programming, Public broadcasting in New Zealand :Category:Television in New Zealand, :Category:New Zealand television shows.

Film
See: :Category:1969 film awards, 1969 in film, List of New Zealand feature films, Cinema of New Zealand, :Category:1969 films

Performing arts

 Grand Master of Magic Award established and presented to Edgar (The Great) Benyon.
 Benny Award established by the Variety Artists Club of New Zealand and presented to Edgar (The Great) Benyon.

Sport

Athletics
 Track events within New Zealand switch from imperial to metric distances. Field events would switch later in 1972.
 Jeff Julian wins his third national title in the men's marathon, clocking 2:19:07.6 on 8 March in Christchurch.

Chess
 The 76th National Chess Championship is held in Wellington, and the title is shared by B.R. Anderson of Christchurch and Ortvin Sarapu of Auckland.

Horse racing

Harness racing
 New Zealand Trotting Cup: Spry
 Auckland Trotting Cup: Leading Light

Shooting
Ballinger Belt – Ian Ballinger (Sydenham)

Soccer
 The Chatham Cup is won by Eastern Suburbs who beat New Brighton 2–0 in the final.
 Teams in the Northern and Central leagues were playing for places in the planned 1970 National league, with the top three in each league being promoted. The Southern League would be represented by Christchurch United, a new club backed by Christchurch City, Shamrock, Rangers and Christchurch Technical, who would continue to play independently in the Southern League.
 Northern League premier division (Thompson Shield) won by Mt Wellington.
 Central League  won by Western Suburbs FC
 Southern League First Division won by Christchurch Technical

Births
 5 January: David Dixon, American football player
 20 January: Blair Larsen, rugby player
 27 January: Shane Thomson, cricketer
 23 February: Michael Campbell, golfer
 24 April: Tony Tuimavave, rugby league player
 3 May: Chris Zoricich, soccer player
 25 June: Liza Hunter-Galvan, long-distance runner
 3 July (in Florida, USA): Leonard King, basketball player
 26 July: Tony Tatupu, rugby league player
 27 July: Brendon Pongia, basketballer and television presenter
 6 August: Simon Doull, cricketer
 6 September: Doug Pirini, decathlete
 9 September: Rachel Hunter, model
 10 September: Craig Innes, rugby footballer
 6 October: Kirsten Smith, javelin thrower
 10 October: Scott Nelson, race walker
 13 October: Hugh McCutcheon, volleyball player and coach
 11 November: Michael Owens, cricketer
 20 November: Chris Harris, cricketer
 5 December (in Maine, USA): Eric Saindon, visual effects supervisor (film)

Deaths
 9 January: Brigadier General Leslie Andrew, VC, DSO, soldier.
 22 January: Sir Matthew Oram, politician and 13th Speaker of the House of Representatives.
 8 May: Sir Sydney Smith, forensic expert.
 15 June: Frank Langstone, politician.
 24 July: Ralph Hanan, politician.
 21 September: William Denham, politician.
 23 October: Janie Searle, Salvation Army officer and community leader.
:Category:1969 deaths

See also
List of years in New Zealand
Timeline of New Zealand history
History of New Zealand
Military history of New Zealand
Timeline of the New Zealand environment
Timeline of New Zealand's links with Antarctica

References

External links

 
New Zealand
Years of the 20th century in New Zealand